Andrei Pavlovich Redkin (born 31 May 1972) is a former Russian football player.

External links
 

1972 births
Sportspeople from Rostov-on-Don
Living people
Soviet footballers
FC SKA Rostov-on-Don players
Russian footballers
FC Rostov players
Russian Premier League players
FC Volgar Astrakhan players
Association football defenders
FC Torpedo Moscow players